2017 Sanfrecce Hiroshima season.

J1 League

References

External links
 J.League official site

Sanfrecce Hiroshima
Sanfrecce Hiroshima seasons